T.J. Oshie is an American professional ice hockey player currently playing for the Washington Capitals of the National Hockey League.

Oshie may also refer to:

Oshie, Cameroon, a village in Cameroon  
Oshie Ridge, a ridge of the Sankwala Mountains
Oshie language, an alternate name for the Ngoshie language of Cameroon